Jack Kerouac Alley, formerly Adler Alley or Adler Place, is a one-way alleyway in San Francisco, California, that connects Grant Avenue in Chinatown, and Columbus Avenue in North Beach. The alley is named after Jack Kerouac, a Beat Generation writer who used to frequent the pub and bookstore adjacent to the alley.

History
The alley had commonly been used for garbage dumping and a shortcut for trucks before poet Lawrence Ferlinghetti, who was the co-founder of City Lights Bookstore, presented his idea in 1988 to the San Francisco Board of Supervisors to transform the alleyway. The project involved repaving the alley, making it a pedestrian walkway, and installing new street lights. The new look alley was reopened to the public in March 2007 and a ceremony was held in April 2007 to celebrate the reopening. The alley is now known for its engraved Western and Chinese writing, by such writers as John Steinbeck, Maya Angelou, Ferlinghetti, and Kerouac himself.

References

External links 

Chinatown, San Francisco
Jack Kerouac
Landmarks in San Francisco
North Beach, San Francisco
Streets in San Francisco